Vajk, Voyk  or Vojk (alternatively spelled Vayk in English, Voicu in Romanian) is an Old Hungarian masculine first name derived from the Turkic Bajik (or Bajiq or Bayk) which meaning is "True Man" or "rich, powerful". Tatars used the name 'Bayk' till the 18th century.

Famous Vajks in history 

Stephen I of Hungary, Grand Prince of the Hungarians (997-1001) and the first King of Hungary (1001-1038)

 The father of John Hunyadi, who was a Voivode of Transylvania (from 1441), captain-general (1444–1446) and regent (1446–1453) of the Kingdom of Hungary. He was also the father of Matthias Corvinus of Hungary, one of its most renowned kings.

Notes

Given names